Anne Marie Brodén (born 1956) is a Swedish politician of the Moderate Party. She has been a member of the Riksdag since 2002.

References

Members of the Riksdag from the Moderate Party
Living people
1956 births
Women members of the Riksdag
Articles containing video clips
Members of the Riksdag 2002–2006
21st-century Swedish women politicians